Killian Mottet (born 15 January 1991) is a Swiss professional ice hockey player currently playing for HC Fribourg-Gottéron of the National League (NL). He was named to the 2022 Swiss Olympic men's ice hockey team.

Career statistics

Regular season and playoffs

International

References

External links

Living people
1991 births
Ice hockey players at the 2022 Winter Olympics
Olympic ice hockey players of Switzerland